TOZ Penkala (full , meaning Zagreb pencil factory) is a Croatian manufacturing company of stationery products, based in Zagreb. It is a leading manufacturer of school and office accessories in Central and Southeast Europe. The company's operations were restarted in 2016, after a brief period of inactivity.

History 
The company was established in 1937. From a small plant for the manufacture of pencils and pastels has grown into today's modern joint-stock company with a long tradition in the production of school and office accessories.

The tradition of writing utensils in Zagreb reaches to the past thanks to the work of Slavoljub Eduard Penkala, one of the region's leading inventors of 20th century, in 1906. He patented and started with production of mechanical pencil and in 1907 with the fountain pen.

From the initial production of classic writing, the company has expanded the product range of modern products for writing, drawing and painting. New technologies, functionality, high quality and standard have affirmed the TOZ as a reliable partner in business circles in the whole world.

Thanks to the successful collaboration with engineer Krunoslav Penkala, son of Slavoljub Penkala, the company entered the tradition of Penkala in the business and introducing of product under that trademark in 2000 and the change of the company 
name in 2001.

Products 
Current products manufactured by TOZ Penkala include:

References

External links 
 Official website

Manufacturing companies established in 1937
Manufacturing companies based in Zagreb
1937 establishments in Croatia
Croatian brands